South-East Ukrainian Autonomous Republic was a Ukrainian political project of pro-Viktor Yanukovych politicians and officials in 2004. Initiated on 26 November 2004 by the Luhansk Oblast Council, the project was discontinued the next month by the Donetsk Oblast Council. The republic was intended to consist out of nine regions of Ukraine.

The idea on creating of the political entity arose at a session of the Luhansk Oblast Council chaired by Viktor Tikhonov and attended by Oleksandr Yefremov. The session adopted a decision to discontinue subordination to the Luhansk State Regional Administration and create a separate executive committee headed by Oleksandr Yefremov. The session also included for revision by the congress of bodies of local self-government and executive power in Southeastern territories of Ukraine a proposition in organization of working group in creation of tax, payment, banking and finance institutions of the Southeastern territories.

Donetsk Mayor Oleksandr Lukyanchenko, however, stated that no one wanted autonomy, but rather sought to stop Orange Revolution demonstrations going on at the time in Kyiv and negotiate a compromise.

See also
2004 Ukrainian presidential election
Novorossiya (confederation)
Novorossiya
Luhansk People's Republic
Donetsk People's Republic

References

External links
Crouch, D. East Ukraine threatens autonomy. The Guardian. 28 November 2004.
Kuzio, T. UKRAINE: East-west break-up fears are overdone. Oxford Analytica. 2 December 2004.

2004 in Ukraine
Donbas
History of Donetsk Oblast
History of Luhansk Oblast
Orange Revolution
Russian irredentism
Separatism in Ukraine